Rihab Chaieb is a Tunisian-Canadian mezzo-soprano.  She has performed frequently with the Canadian Opera Company, appeared several times at the Metropolitan Opera, and has also toured extensively in Europe and the United States.

Early life and education
Chaieb is Tunisian born and settled in Montreal, Canada with her parents at the age of 2. Chaieb studied voice at McGill University’s Schulich School of Music, and also at the Franz Schubert Institute in Baden bei Wien. She was a member of the Metropolitan Opera's Lindemann Young Artist Development Program, from which she graduated in 2019.

Opera career
Chaieb states her most personally meaningful role has been Sesto in Mozart's La clemenza di Tito, which she performed with the Canadian Opera Company in Toronto.

Operatic roles thus far have included:

 Tebaldo in Verdi's Don Carlo at the Opéra National de Bordeaux
 Zulma in Rossini's L'italiana in Algeri at the Metropolitan Opera
 Waltraute in Atom Egoyan's production of Wagner's Die Walküre with the Canadian Opera Company
 Cherubino in Mozart's Le nozze di Figaro at Cincinnati Opera
 Nefertiti in Philip Glass' Akhnaten (opera) at the Metropolitan Opera 
 Dorabella in Mozart's Cosi fan tutte at the Washington National Opera in March 2022

Concert career
Chaieb performed Mahler's Das Lied von der Erde at the 2019 Toronto Summer Music Festival, conducted by Gemma New. She performed in J.S Bach's Magnificat in her Carnegie Hall debut in December 2016.

Awards
Chaieb won third prize at the 2018 edition of the Operalia competition. In addition, she has taken prizes at both the Metropolitan Opera National Council Auditions and the 2018 George London Foundation Competition.

See also 

Julie Nesrallah
Arab Canadians
Tunisian Canadians

References 

21st-century Canadian women opera singers
Living people
Year of birth missing (living people)
McGill University School of Music alumni
Tunisian emigrants to Canada